Dick Butler may refer to:

 Dick Butler (ice hockey) (1926–2000), Canadian ice hockey right wing
 Dick Butler (footballer) (1911–1984), English footballer
 Dick Butler (baseball) (1869–1917), Major League Baseball catcher